Cowspiracy: The Sustainability Secret is a 2014 American documentary film produced and directed by Kip Andersen and Keegan Kuhn. The film explores the impact of animal agriculture on the environment—examining such environmental concerns as climate change, water use, deforestation, and ocean dead zones—and investigates the policies of several environmental organizations on the issue.

Cowspiracy has been criticized for falsely asserting that animal agriculture is the primary source of greenhouse gas emissions and environmental destruction, with other sources assessing the impact as being less than is stated in the film. The film won the Audience Choice Award at the 2015 South African Eco Film Festival and the Best Foreign Film Award at the 12th annual Festival de films de Portneuf sur l'environnement.

Synopsis
The documentary was directed by Kip Andersen and Keegan Kuhn, and explores the impact of animal agriculture on the environment, and investigates the policies of environmental organizations on this issue. Environmental organizations investigated in the film include Greenpeace, Sierra Club, Surfrider Foundation, Rainforest Action Network, and Oceana.

Production
The film was crowdfunded on Indiegogo, with 1,449 contributors giving $117,092. This funding was 217% of their goal, and it allowed them to dub the film into Spanish and German and subtitle it into more than 10 other languages, including Chinese and Russian. Screenings are licensed through the distributor, as well as through the now-defunct Tugg Inc. website.

An updated version of the documentary, executive-produced by Leonardo DiCaprio, premiered globally on Netflix on September 15, 2015.

The 2017 documentary What the Health was written, produced, and directed by the same production team (Kip Andersen and Keegan Kuhn) as Cowspiracy.

Featured individuals 

The following individuals were featured in the film:
Michael Klaper (physician, author, advisor) 
Howard Lyman (former rancher, author, activist) 
lauren Ornelas (Food Empowerment Project) 
Michael Pollan (author, lecturer)
William Potter (journalist)
Kirk R. Smith (environmental health sciences)
Josh Tetrick (founder of Hampton Creek)
John Jeavons (biointensive agriculture advocate)

Reception

Cowspiracy won the Audience Choice Award at the 2015 South African Eco Film Festival, as well as the Best Foreign Film Award at the 12th annual Festival de films de Portneuf sur l'environnement. It was also nominated for Cinema Politica's 2015 Audience Choice Award.

Factual inaccuracy

Cowspiracy has been criticized for falsely claiming that animal agriculture is the primary source of both greenhouse gases and associated environmental destruction. Scientific reports from the Intergovernmental Panel on Climate Change have consistently reached the consensus that the leading cause of anthropogenic warming is the combustion of fossil fuels accounting for about two-thirds of emissions, not animal agriculture.

Doug Boucher, reviewing the film for the Union of Concerned Scientists, disputed the film's assertion that 51% of global greenhouse gases are caused by animal agriculture. He described the 51% figure as being sourced from a 2009 Worldwatch Institute report by Robert Goodland and Jeff Anhang not from a peer-reviewed scientific paper. He claimed to have observed methodological flaws in Goodland and Anhang's logic, and said that the scientific community formed a consensus that global warming is primarily caused by humanity's burning of fossil fuels. He stated that the scientific consensus is that livestock contribute 15% of global greenhouse gas emissions, far lower than the 51% stated by the film and the source article. A 2018 peer-reviewed meta-analysis found that a "no animal products" scenario would deliver a 28% reduction in global greenhouse gas emissions across all sectors of the economylower than the film's assertion of 51%, but higher than Boucher's claim of 15%.

See also 
 Environmental impact of meat production
 List of vegan media
 Livestock's Long Shadow
 Intensive animal farming
 Racing Extinction
 Holocene extinction
 The Sixth Extinction
Seaspiracy
 Veganism

References

Works cited

 .

External links

 
 Cowspiracy infographic
 
 
 

2014 films
2014 in the environment
American documentary films
Documentary films about environmental issues
Documentary films about agriculture
Agriculture and the environment
Documentary films about animal rights
Documentary films about vegetarianism
Vegetarianism in the United States
2010s English-language films
2010s American films